Elina Brotherus (born 29 April 1972) is a Finnish photographer and video artist specializing in self-portraits and landscapes.

Life
Brotherus was born in Helsinki. She earned an M.S. in analytical chemistry from the University of Helsinki in 1997 and an M.F.A. in photography from the University of Art and Design Helsinki in 2000. She is considered a prominent member of The Helsinki School. She lives and works in Finland and France. In 2003 her work was exhibited by the Orange County Museum of Art in Girls’ Night Out. She won a scholarship from the Carnegie Art Award in 2004 and she won the Niépce Prize in 2006. She is proud of being able to produce images taken from nature that are not "Photoshopped". Her work is primarily autobiographical. She documents her infertility and "involuntary childlessness" in her 2011–2015 series "Carpe Fucking Diem" and 2009-2013 "Annonciation."

Awards 
 Niepce Prize 2006
 Carnegie Art Award 2004
 Citigroup Private Bank Photography Prize 2002
 Fotofinlandia 2000 award for photography.

References

External links
 

1972 births
Living people
21st-century Finnish women artists
21st-century women photographers
Artists from Helsinki
Finnish photographers
Finnish women photographers
Aalto University School of Arts, Design and Architecture alumni